Radium chloride is an inorganic compound with the chemical formula . It is a radium salt of hydrogen chloride. It was the first radium compound isolated in a pure state. Marie Curie and André-Louis Debierne used it in their original separation of radium from barium. The first preparation of radium metal was by the electrolysis of a solution of this salt using a mercury cathode.

Preparation
Radium chloride crystallises from aqueous solution as the dihydrate. The dihydrate is dehydrated by heating to 100 °C in air for one hour followed by 5.5 hours at 520 °C under argon. If the presence of other anions is suspected, the dehydration may be effectuated by fusion under hydrogen chloride.

Radium chloride can also be prepared by heating radium bromide in a flow of dry hydrogen chloride gas. It can produced by treating radium carbonate with hydrochloric acid.

Properties
Radium chloride is a colorless salt with a blue-green luminescence, especially when heated. Its color gradually changes to yellow with aging, whereas contamination by barium may impart a rose tint. It is less soluble in water than other alkaline earth metal chlorides – at 25 °C its solubility is 245 g/L whereas that of barium chloride is 307 g/L, and the difference is even larger in hydrochloric acid solutions. This property is used in the first stages of the separation of radium from barium by fractional crystallization. Radium chloride is only sparingly soluble in azeotropic hydrochloric acid and virtually insoluble in concentrated hydrochloric acid.

Gaseous  shows strong absorptions in the visible spectrum at 676.3 nm and 649.8 nm (red): the dissociation energy of the radium–chlorine bond is estimated as 2.9 eV, and its length as 292 pm.

Contrary to diamagnetic barium chloride, radium chloride is weakly paramagnetic with a magnetic susceptibility of 1.05. Its flame color is red.

Uses
Radium chloride is still used for the initial stages of the separation of radium from barium during the extraction of radium from pitchblende. The large quantities of material involved (to extract a gram of pure radium metal, about 7 tonnes of pitchblende is required) favour this less costly (but less efficient) method over those based on radium bromide or radium chromate (used for the later stages of the separation).

It was also used in medicine to produce radon gas which in turn was used as a brachytheraputic cancer treatment.

Radium-223 dichloride (USP, radium chloride Ra 223), tradename Xofigo (formerly Alpharadin), is an alpha-emitting radiopharmaceutical. Bayer received FDA approval for this drug to treat prostate cancer osteoblastic bone metastases in May 2013. Radium-223 chloride is one of the most potent ((antineoplastic drugs)) known. One dose (50 kBq/kg) in an adult is about 60 nanograms; this amount is 1/1000 the weight of an eyelash (75 micrograms).

References

Bibliography
Kirby, H. W. and Salutsky, Murrell L. (1964) The Radiochemistry of Radium, Subcommittee on Radiochemistry, National Academy of Sciences

Sources
Gmelins Handbuch der anorganischen Chemie (8. Aufl.), Berlin:Verlag Chemie, 1928, pp. 60–61.
Gmelin Handbuch der anorganischen Chemie (8. Aufl. 2. Erg.-Bd.), Berlin:Springer, 1977, pp. 362–64.

Chlorides
Alkaline earth metal halides
Radium compounds